Qaleh Bahman or Qaleh-ye Bahman may refer to:
 Qaleh-ye Bahman, Fars
 Qaleh Bahman, Isfahan
 Bahman Jan-e Sofla
 Qaleh-ye Bahman Jan-e Olya